Word of Mouth is the fifth album by rapper John Reuben, released on February 6, 2007.

The songs "Focus" and "Good Evening" were featured in the 2007 video game Thrillville: Off the Rails by LucasArts.

Track listing
"Sing It Like You Mean It" – 3:06
"Tryin' Too Hard" – 3:09
"Make Money Money" – 4:29
"Focus" – 3:32
"Word of Mouth" – 4:04
"Miserable Exaggeration" – 3:28
"Universal" – 3:42
"Curiosity" – 3:18
"Cool the Underdog" – 3:27
"Good Evening" – 3:53

Awards

In 2008, the album was nominated for a Dove Award for Rap/Hip-Hop Album of the Year at the 39th GMA Dove Awards. The title song was also nominated for Rap/Hip-Hop Recorded Song of the Year.

References

2007 albums
John Reuben albums
Gotee Records albums